Lina Jonn, birth name Carolina Johnsson, (1861–1896) was a Swedish professional photographer who is remembered for her documentary work.

Early life
Jonn was born as Carolina Johnsson on 8 March 1861 in Stora Råby near Lund in Scania, south-western Sweden. Daughter of the farmer Jons Johnsson and his wife Hanna Pålsdotter, she was the sixth of seven children.

When she was 16, Jonn found work as a governess on an estate near Höör. After studying German and French for a short period in Lund, in 1879 she went to Neuchatel, Switzerland, to continue her studies. In 1880, she moved to England where she taught music, languages and art. She contemplated becoming a physical education teacher but was unable to do so as a result of a back ailment. After spending a further period in Switzerland studying painting, she returned to Sweden where she became a photographer.

Career
Jonn appears to have learnt photography in Paris but her first professional work was in the Swedish city of Helsingborg where she joined the Finnish photographer Per Alexis Brandt who ran a studio there. In 1891, she opened her own studio in Lund which soon attracted many influential customers. Portraits for family albums or for visiting cards were becoming increasingly popular at the time. Business prospered and Jonn received several awards for her work.

In 1893, while on holiday in Norway with her sister Erika, Jonn met her husband to be, Gudbrand Ole Tandberg, a Norwegian farmer. Impressed by his earnest, knowledgeable and idealistic approach, she was immediately taken by him although he was 16 years her senior. They married in 1895 and the following year she gave birth to a son. Some two months later, on Christmas Day 1896, she died of heart failure at the young age of 35.

References

Further reading
 

1861 births
1896 deaths
People from Lund Municipality
Swedish women photographers
19th-century Swedish photographers
19th-century women photographers